Murray Spivack (September 6, 1903 – May 8, 1994) was an American sound engineer best known as the sound designer for the 1933 film King Kong. He won an Oscar for Sound Recording and was nominated for another in the same category. He was also a drum teacher whose students included Louie Bellson, Remo Belli, David Garibaldi, William Kraft, Alan Maitland, Jim Banks, Chad Wackerman and Joe Morello.

Awards
Spivack won an Academy Award and was nominated for another:

Won
 Hello, Dolly! (1969)

Nominated
 Tora! Tora! Tora! (1970)

References

External links

1903 births
1994 deaths
American audio engineers
Best Sound Mixing Academy Award winners
20th-century American engineers
Emigrants from the Russian Empire to the United States